Mikala Dwyer is an Australian artist born in 1959 in Sydney. She is a contemporary sculptor who was shortlisted with fellow artist Justene Williams to represent Australia at the 2019 Venice Biennale.

Education
In 1983, Mikala Dwyer attended the University of Sydney and in 1986 received a Bachelor of Fine Art. Dwyer also spent time at the Middlesex University from 1985 to 1986 in the United Kingdom. In 2000, Dwyer earned her Masters of Fine Art at the University of New South Wales, College of Fine Art. Dwyer also trained under Professor Stan Douglas at Berlin University of the Arts from 2005 to 2007.

Career
Dwyer has been producing work for exhibition since the early 1980s, developing a career in installation and sculptural work. Her practice deals with the spiritual, magic, rituals, the occult, alchemy and the "other". Dwyer's practice can be described as "playful and fanatical" as she invites the audience to participate with her works and draw their own conclusions. Dwyer is known for her use of everyday materials such as plastics, metal, wood, fabric, paint, plants and other found objects.

In 1992 Dwyer was amount the first group of young Australian artists selected to have their work exhibited in the first Primavera exhibition, held at the Museum of Contemporary Art Australia. Curated by Linda Michael, the exhibition included James Angus, Dwyer, Gale Hastings, and Constance Zikos. In 2000 Dwyer had a major solo exhibition at the Museum of Contemporary Art Australia. The exhibition included the recent works from Dwyer's practice as well as site specific pieces tailored to interact with the gallery space. In 2010 Dwyer created an installation titled Square Cloud Compound on Cockatoo Island for the Biennale of Sydney. Dwyer's work deals with the island's ominous history in a playful manner. In 2016 Dwyer was awarded a National Association for the Visual Arts Visual and Fellowship grant, which was funded by the Copyright Agency's Cultural Fund. In 2017 Dwyer had another major solo exhibition held at the Art Gallery of New South Wales titled A Shape of Thought. The exhibition explored Dwyer's investigation of "the consciousness and liveliness of matter surrounding us" and was composed of current artworks which included Square Cloud Compound (2010), The letterbox Marys (2015–17), and The silvering (2017). In 2018 Dwyer and Justene Williams, with curators Susan Best and Ann Stephen, were shortlisted to represent Australia at the 2019 Venice Biennale. Although their proposal was not selected, it was later remodelled into "Mondspiel" part of the Bauhaus Now exhibition. In 2019 Ann Stephen curated Bauhaus Now, an exhibition that was held at the Buxton Contemporary, Melbourne for the 100th anniversary celebration of the Bauhaus. Mikala Dwyer and Justene Williams collaborated to create installations focusing on the "Bauhaus legacy in Australia".

Dwyer has lectured at Sydney College of Art, the University of Sydney, as well as being an associate professor at RMIT University, Melbourne City Campus.

Dwyer has work in the following collections: the Cruthers Collection of Women's Art, University of Western Australia; National Gallery of Australia, Canberra; University of New South Wales, Sydney; Museum of Contemporary Art Australia, Sydney; UQ Art Gallery, University of Queensland, Brisbane; Heide Museum of Modern Art, Melbourne; National Gallery of Victoria, Melbourne; Monash University Museum of Art, Melbourne; Museum of Old and New Art, Hobart; Auckland City Gallery, New Zealand.

Solo exhibitions
 In the Manger, Chapel of Love, Sydney, 1982 
 Drunheart, performance, ANZART, Old Mail Exchange, Hobart, 1983
 Poor Bare Forked Animal (with Mary Rose Sinn), Chelsea College of Art, London, 1985
 Becalmed, City Artists Gallery, London, 1986
 Untitled Installation, First Draft, Sydney, 1987 
 Boot, KSK Gallery, Sydney, 1988
 Untitled Installation, 338 Gallery, Sydney, 1988
 Untitled Installation, Window Gallery, Sydney, 1989
 Ringing, First Draft, Sydney, 1989
 Wall to Wall: Ceiling to Floor, 200 Gertrude Street, Melbourne, 1990
 Untitled Installation, First Draft West, Sydney, 1990
 Untitled Installation, First Draft West, Sydney, 1991
 Untitled Installation, 200 Gertrude Street, Melbourne, 1991
 Untitled Installation, BLACK, Sydney, 1992
 Henle's Loop, Institute of Modern Art, Brisbane, 1993
 Whoops, Sarah Cottier Gallery, Sydney, 1994
 Jean's OK, Regents Court Hotel, Sydney, 1994
 Collaboration With Gale Hastings, CBD Gallery, Sydney 1994
 Sad Songs, Artspace, Sydney, 1995
 Voodoo Lambchop, Teststrip, Auckland, 1995
 Vincent (Aires), Dunedin Public Art Gallery, Dunedin, 1995
 Nail-Polish Paintings, Hamish McKay Gallery, Wellington, 1995
 Recent Old Work, Sarah Cottier Gallery, Sydney, 1996
 New Work, Hamish McKay Gallery, Wellington, 1996
 Tubeweight, CBD Gallery, Sydney, 1996
 Hollowware and a Few Solids, Australian Centre of Contemporary Art, Melbourne, 1996
 I.O.U, CBD Gallery, Sydney, 1998
 Addon (Clothing Plan) (Closing Plan), Hamish McKay Gallery, Wellington, 1998
 A Work by Mikala Dwyer Done in Someone Else's Studio, Fortitude Valley, Brisbane, 1998
 Uniform, Sarah Cottier Gallery, Sydney, 1999
 Mikala Dwyer Solo Exhibition, Museum of Contemporary Art, Sydney 2000
 Indifinity Maybe; I Care Because You Do; The Loozer Planet; Sweetpotatosexpet Antenna; Hanging Eyes; I.O.U (a tile); My Home is Your Home; Floating Old Man; Selfshel, Chapel Art Centre, Cardiff, 2000
 Iffytown, Hamish McKay Gallery, Wellington, 2000
 Mikala Dwyer, Sarah Cottier Gallery, Sydney, 2001
 Mikala Dwyer, Hamish McKay Gallery, Wellington, 2001
 Art Lifts, National Gallery of Australia, Canberra, 2002
 Flowers, Flies and Someone Else, Anna Schwartz Gallery, Melbourne, 2004
 Some More Recent Old Work, Darren Knight Gallery, Sydney, 2004
 I Maybe We, Museum of New Zealand Te Papa Tongarewa, Wellington, 2005
 The Addition and Subtractions; The Hanging Garden, Kunstraum, Potsdam, 2007
 Moon Garden, Aratoi Museum, Masterton, 2008
 Costumes and Empty Sculptures, Institute of Modern Art, Brisbane, 2008
 Outfield, Roslyn Oxley9 Gallery, Sydney, 2009
 Square Cloud Compound, Biennale of Sydney, Sydney, 2010
 Square Cloud Compound, Hamish Morrison Gallery, Berlin, 2010
 Swamp Geometry, Anna Schwartz Gallery, Melbourne, 2011
 The Silvering, Anna Schwartz Gallery, Melbourne, 2011
 Drawing Down the Moon, Institute of Modern Art, Brisbane, 2012
 Panto Collapsar, Arts Project, Berlin, 2012 
 Divinations for the Real Things, Roslyn Oxley9 Gallery, Sydney, 2012
 Goldene Bend're, Australian Centre for Contemporary Art, Melbourne, 2013
 Hollowwork, Anna Schwartz Gallery, Melbourne, 2014
 The Garden of Half Life, University Art Gallery, The University of Sydney, Sydney, 2014 
 Pantocollapsar, Mermaid Arts Centre, Bray, Ireland, 2014 
 Underfall, Mildura Arts Centre, Mildura, 2014
 The letterbox Marys, Roslyn Oxley9 Gallery, Sydney, 2015
 Mikala Dwyer: MCA Collection, Curated by Natasha Bullock, Museum of Contemporary Art, Sydney, 2015
 In the Head of Humans, Hopkinson Mossman, Auckland, 2016
 Square Cloud Compound, Museum of Contemporary Art, Sydney, 2016
 A Shape of Thought, Art Gallery of New South Wales, Sydney, 2017
 Soft Relics, Roslyn Oxley9 Gallery, Sydney, 2018

Select group exhibitions
 APMIRA Land Rights Exhibition, Paddington Town Hall, Sydney, 1982
 ANZART (performance in Hardened Arteries), Old Mail Exchange, Hobart, 1983
 Certain Versions, City Artist Gallery, London, 1986
 Eevy, Ivy, Over, with Belinda Holland, First Draft, Sydney, 1988
Exploring Drawing, Ivan Dougherty Gallery, Sydney, 1989
Fresh Art, S.H. Irvin Gallery, Sydney 1989
Installed and Temporal Work, Tin Shed, Sydney, 1990
Disonnance: Frames of Reference, Pier 4/5, Sydney, 1991
Discrete Entity, Canberra School of Art Gallery, Canberra, 1991
Primavera, Museum of Contemporary Art, Sydney, 1992
Wish Hard, 9th Biennale of Sydney, Wollongong City Gallery, Sydney, 1992
Australian Perspecta, Art Gallery of New South Wales, Sydney, 1993
Purl, The Fifth Melbourne Sculpture Triennial, West Melbourne Primary School, Melbourne DEcor, Pepper Bistro, Canberra, 1993
Monster Field, Ivan Dougherty Gallery, Sydney, 1993
Shirthead, Mori Annexe, Sydney, 1993
True Stories, Artspace, Sydney, 1994
The Aberrant Object: Women Dada and Surrealism, Heide Museum of Modern Art, Melbourne, 1994
Aussemblage, Auckland City Gallery, Auckland, 1994
OrientATION, 4th International Istanbul Biennale, Istanbul, 1995
A Night at the Show, Field, Zurich, Switzerland, 1995
De Huid van der Whitte Dame (The White Lady's Skin), Eindhoven, The Netherlands, 1995
The Believers: Mikala Dwyer, Maria Cruz, Anne OOms, CBD Gallery, Sydney; Artspace Gallery, Auckland, 1997
Object and Ideas – revisiting minimalism, Museum of Contemporary Art, Sydney, 1997
Body Suits, Perth Institute of Contemporary Arts, Perth, 1998
The Infinite Space: Women, Minimalism and the Sculptural Objects, Ian Potter Museum of Art, National Gallery of Victoria, Melbourne, 1998
Close Quarters: Contemporary Art from Australia and New Zealand, Australian Centre for Contemporary Art, Monash University, Melbourne; Canberra school of Art, Govett Brewster Art Gallery, New Plymouth, 1998
Beauty 2000, Institute of Modern Art, Brisbane, 1998
Contempora5, Ian Potter Museum of Art, National Gallery of Victoria Australia, Melbourne, 1999
Avant-Gardism for Children, University of Queensland, Brisbane; Monash University Gallery, Melbourne, 1999
Brainland – The Believers: Mikala Dwyer, Maria Cruz, Anne Ooms, Art Gallery of New South Wales, Sydney, 1999
9 Lives, Casula Powerhouse, Sydney, 1999
Nostalgia for the Future, Artspace, Auckland, 1999
Monochromes, University Art Museum, University of Queensland, Brisbane, 2000
Plastika, Govett-Brewster Art Gallery, Auckland, 2000
Bonheurs des Antipodes, Musee de Picardie, Amiens, 2000
Verso Süd, Palazzo Doria Pamphiji, Rome, 2000
Artful Park, Centennial Park, Sydney, 2001
Unnecessary Invention, Artspace, Sydney, 2001
Fieldwork: Australian Art 1968–2002, Ian Potter Museum of Art, National Gallery of Victoria, Melbourne, 2002
Helen Lempriere National Sculpture Award, Werribbe Park, Melbourne, 2002
Face Up: Contemporary Art from Australia, Nationalgalerie im Hamburger Bahnhoff, Berlin, 2003
This was the Future... Australian Sculpture of the 1950s, 60s, 70s + Today, Heide Museum of Modern Art, Melbourne, 2003
Still Life, Art Gallery of New South Wales, Sydney, 2003
The Shangri-La Collective, Artspace, Sydney, 2003
Pegging Out, Hazelhurst Regional Gallery & Art Centre, Gymea, 2004
Three-way Abstraction: Works of the Monash University Collection, Monash University Museum of Art, Melbourne, 2004
The Wallflower, Canberra Contemporary Art Space, Canberra, 2005
National Sculpture Prize and Exhibition 2005, National Gallery of Australia, Canberra, 2005
Unscripted: Language in Contemporary Art, Art Gallery of New South Wales, Sydney, 2005
High Tide, Zacheta National Gallery, Warsaw, touring CAC, Vilnius, Lithuania, 2006
Beckon, Perth Institute of Contemporary Art, Perth, 2006
Out of Context, OMI Sculpture Park, New York City, 2006
21st Century Modern: 2006 Adelaide Biennial of Australian Art, Art Gallery of South Australia, Nada Art Fair, Miami, 2006
Von Riots Zu Angels, NYRT, Berlin, 2007
Truths, Auckland Art Gallery, Auckland, 2007
Den Haag Sculptuur 2007 De Overkant / Down Under, The Netherlands, 2007
Bal Tashchit: Thou Shalt Not Destroy, Jewish Museum, Melbourne, 2008
Lost and Found: An Archaeology of the Present, TarraWarra Biennal, TarraWarra Museum of Art, Victoria, 2008
Common Space, Private Space, Margaret Lawrence Gallery, Victorian College of the Arts, Melbourne, 2008
Come-In: Interior Design as a Contemporary Art Medium in Germany, RMIT Gallery, Melbourne, 2008
Axis Bold as Love Video Salon, CAPC Bordeaux, 2008
To Make a Work Of Timeless Art, Museum of Contemporary Art, Sydney, 2008
Zeigen. An Audio Tour through Berlin, with Karin Sander, Temporare Kunsthalle, Berlin, 2009
Mirror Mirror, then and now, Institute of Modern Art, Brisbane; University Art Gallery, Verge Gallery and Tin Sheds Gallery, Sydney; Samstag Museum of Art, Adelaide, 2009
The Beauty of Distance: Songs of Survival in a Precarious Age the 17th Biennale of Sydney, Alterbeast, Super Deluxe, Artspace, in The Beauty of Distance: Songs of Survival in a Precarious Age the 17th Biennale of Sydney, 2010
Alterbeast, Gertrude Contemporary Art Spaces, Melbourne, 2010
Before and After Science, 2010 Biennial of Australian Art, Adelaide, 2010
Ich Wicht, Kunstraum, Potsdam, 2010
Captain Thunderbolt's Sisters, with Justene Williams, Cockatoo Island Artists in Residence Programme, Sydney, 2010
To Give Time to Time, with Natural Selection Theory, Australian Experimental Art Foundation, Adelaide, 2010
Colour Baazar, Heide Museum of Modern Art, Melbourne, 2011
NETWORKS (cells & silos), Monash University Museum of Art, Melbourne, 2011
Alterbeast, Penrith Regional Museum, Penrith, Australia, 2011
Monanism, Museum of Old and New Art, Hobart, 2011
Plus ou Moins Sorcières 2/3: Epreuves Ritulisées, Maison Populaire, Paris, 2012
Less is More, Heide Museum of Modern Art, Melbourne, 2012
Das Ende des 20. Jahrhunderts. Es Kommt Noch Besser: Ein Dialog mit der Sammlung Marx, Hamburger Bahnhof, Berlin, 2013
Light Sweet Crude, Hopkinson Mossman Gallery, Auckland, 2013
Schwarz//Weiss, Hamish Morrison Gallery, Berlin, 2013
Primavera 2014 (curator) Museum of Contemporary Art, Sydney, 2014
The Cinemas Project: Exploring The Spectral Spaces of Cinema, Mildura Arts Centre, Melbourne, 2014
From a Near Future, SCA Gallery, Sydney College of the Arts, University of Sydney, Sydney, 2014
De Rerum Natura, Studio La Citta, Verona, Italy, 2014
You Imagine What You Desire, curated by Juliana Engburg, 19th Biennale of Sydney, Cockatoo Island, Sydney, 2014
Future Primitive, Heide Museum of Modern Art, Melbourne, 2014
Dead Ringer, Perth Institute of Contemporary Art, Perth, 2015
Antropia, curated by Marco Meneguzzo, Eduardo Secci Contemporary, Florence, 2015
Hall of Half-Life, Strierischer Herbst Festival, GrazMuseum, Graz, 2015
Saint Judes's Leftovers (Your Thoughts in Lights), Stierischer Herbst Festival, Vordernberg, 2015
Believe not every spirit, but try the spirits, Monash University Museum of Art, Melbourne, 2015
Hiding in Plain Sight: A selection of works from the Michael Buxton Collection, Bendigo Art Gallery, Victoria, 2015
Neverwhere, curated by Vikki McInnes, Gaia Gallery, Istanbul, 2015
MAGNETISM, Hazelwood, Sligo, 2015
Deeply Highly Eccentric, Winchester Gallery, Winchester School of Art, Hampshire, 2015
Glazed and Confused, Hazelhurst Regional Gallery, Sydney, 2015
Square Cloud Compound, Encounters, curated by Alexie Glass-Kantor, Art Basel Hong Kong, Hong Kong, 2015
Redlands Konica Minolta ArtPrize, curated by Tim Johnson, National Art School Gallery, Sydney, 2015
Primavera at 25: MCA Collection, Museum of Contemporary Art, Sydney, 2016
Quicksilver, Anne & Gordon Samstag Museum of Art, University of South Australia, Adelaide, 2016
Soft Core, curated by Michael Do, Casula Powerhouse Arts Centre, Sydney, 2016
Erewhon, curated by Vikki McInnes, Margaret Lawrence Gallery, Victoria College of the Arts, Melbourne, 2016
Wonder, curated by Carrie Kibbler, Hazelhurst Regional Gallery, Sydney, 2016
Riddle of the Burial Grounds, curated by Tessa Giblan, Extra City Kunsthal, Antwerp, 2016
Fabrik, Ian Potter Museum of Art, Melbourne, 2016
Dämmerschlaf, Artspace, Sydney, 2016
Soft Core, Lake Macquarie City Art Gallery, Booragul; Hawksbury Regional Art Gallery, Windsor, 2017
Occulture: The Dark Arts, City Gallery, Wellington, 2017
Every Brilliant Eye: Australian Art of the 1990s, National Gallery of Victoria, Melbourne, 2017
Triple Point of Matter, Foundation Fiminco, Paris, 2017
Unpainting, Art Gallery of South Gallery, Sydney, 2017
Occulture: The Dark Arts, City Gallery, Wellington, 2017
Blessed Be: Mysticism, Spirituality, and the Occult in Contemporary Art, curated by Ginger Shulick, Museum of Contemporary Art, Tucson, 2018
The shape of things to come, Buxton Contemporary, Melbourne Soft Core, Shepparton Art Museum, Shepparton, 2018
Second Sight: Witchcraft, Ritual, Power, The University of Queensland Art Museum, Brisbane, 2019
Bauhaus Now, curated by Ann Stephen, Buxton Contemporary, Melbourne, 2019

References

Further reading
 Susan Rothnie and Mikala Dwyer. Mikala Dwyer in Conversation with Susan Rothnie. Eyeline, (spring 2004) Vol.55: 30–33. 
Benjamin Genocchio. Alchemy with a Mischievous Touch. Sydney Morning Herald, 29 December 2000.
Sue Cramer. Colour Bazaar Exhibition Catalogue. Heide Museum of Art, Melbourne, 2011. 
Sally Butler. Mikala Dwyer's Occult Constructivism. Eyeline, 2012 No. 77
Sally Butler. Mikala Dwyer's Occult Constructivism. Eyeline, (summer 2014) Vol.77: 46–51.
Susan Best. Mineral Nature: Mikala Dwyer Rocks. 2014. 
Luke Parker. Mikala Dwyer: The Garden of Half-Life. The University of Sydney, 2014
Joel Meares. Mikala Dwyer 'jelly-legged' at art prize win. The Sydney Morning Herald, 25 March 2015.
Emma O’Neil. Mikala Dwyer: Museum of Contemporary Art Australia Collection. Art AsiaPacific (May/June 2016) Iss 98: 118.
Wayne Tunnicliffe. Mikala Dwyer: A shape of thought Exhibition Catalogue. Art Gallery of New South Wales, 2017.
Rex Butler. Resurrecting Spirit: Mikala Dwyer in 'Bauhaus Now'. Art Monthly Australasia, (winter 2019) no 317: 54–58.

External links
 Mikala Dwyer at The Art Gallery of New South Wales 
 Mikala Dwyer in Bauhaus Now at Buxton Contemporary 
 Anna Schwartz Gallery: Mikala Dwyer Biography  
 Mikala Dwyer at The Institute of Modern Art
 The University of Queensland Art Museum: Mikala Dwyer Artist Profile
 Museum of Contemporary Art Australia: Mikala Dwyer Biography
 Mikala Dwyer at Museum of Contemporary Art Primavera: Young Australian Artist Exhibition
 Mikala Dwyer at The Museum of Contemporary Art Australia 
 National Association for the Visual Arts: Mikala Dwyer Artist Profile
 Mikala Dwyer at The Australian Centre of Contemporary Art
 Roslyn Oxley9 Gallery: Mikala Dwyer Artist Profile
 Australian Council of the Arts: Announcing Australian Artist For Venice Biennale 2019

1959 births
Living people
Artists from Sydney
University of Sydney alumni
Alumni of Middlesex University
University of New South Wales alumni
Australian women sculptors
Australian installation artists
Australian contemporary artists
Women installation artists
20th-century Australian sculptors
21st-century Australian sculptors
20th-century Australian women artists
21st-century Australian women artists